Brokers Tip (March 16, 1930 – July 14, 1953), by Black Toney out of the French mare Forteresse, was a Thoroughbred racehorse and the only horse in history whose sole win was in the Kentucky Derby.

Kentucky Derby
His Derby win went down in history as the "Fighting Finish" because Brokers Tip's jockey (Don Meade) and Herb Fisher (the jockey aboard rival Head Play) literally fought one another atop their mounts down the homestretch. In an era before photo finishes, Brokers Tip was declared the winner by a nose.

Retirement and stud record
Retired to stud duty, Brokers Tip was standing at stud in California in December 1941 when his stature as a stallion increased considerably as a result of the 1941 successes of his son Market Wise, who went on to earn 1943 American Co-Champion Older Male Horse honors.

Broker's Tip was donated to UC Davis in 1950 by then-owner Ralph Taylor for veterinary instructional purposes. Broker's Tip, at age 23, was euthanized on July 14, 1953, due to problems associated with old age. His skeleton was preserved for future study at the University of California.

See also

 Idle Hour Stock Farm
 Kentucky Derby
 Market Wise

References

External links
 1933 Kentucky Derby
 Brokers Tip's pedigree

1930 racehorse births
1953 racehorse deaths
Racehorses bred in Kentucky
Racehorses trained in the United States
Kentucky Derby winners
Thoroughbred family 12-c